Pine Island is the largest island on the Gulf Coast of peninsular Florida in the United States. Located in Lee County, on the Gulf of Mexico coast of southwest Florida, it is also the 118th largest island in the United States. The Intracoastal Waterway passes through Pine Island Sound, to the west of the island. Matlacha Pass runs between Pine Island and the mainland. Pine Island lies west of Cape Coral. For many years, Pine Island was a major commercial fishing community and many of its full-time residents still fish commercially today.

Geography
Unlike the sandy barrier islands of Sanibel to the south, Captiva to the southwest, and North Captiva to the west, Pine Island has no large beach and is made from the same coral rock as the mainland. Pine Island is surrounded by mangroves and includes three aquatic preserves. Residents and visitors are attracted to Pine Island's natural rural character, fishing, and boating. Pine Island is mostly zoned as agricultural land; some visitors travel more than a hundred miles to purchase tropical fruit such as lychee and mangos grown and sold on Pine Island.

Communities
Pine Island is home to four unincorporated towns: Pine Island Center, St. James City, Bokeelia, and Pineland. Matlacha also is considered one of the communities, but is on its own small island. Pine Island has a small town atmosphere, with no traffic lights and mostly agricultural zoning. The Greater Matlacha and Pine Island community has its own fire control district with an elected 5-person commission, marinas, shops, and fine casual restaurants. According to the 2000 census, the population of Pine Island is about 9000, however, the population varies seasonally, Pine Island being a winter home for many of its residents.  Utilities are provided by LCEC for electricity and Pine Island Water Association (a private member coop). Cable TV is provided by Comcast and/or any of the various satellite providers.

Pine Island Center is located at the intersection of Pine Island and Stringfellow Roads. Pine Island Road (County Road 78) is the only road that leads to the mainland. Pine Island Center is the location of the island's single large grocery store, elementary school, library, museum, swimming pool, and a large park. Sixteen-mile-long Stringfellow Road (County Road 767) is Pine Island's main road and connects St. James City on the south end of the island with Bokeelia and Pineland on the north side of the island. St. James City, Pine Island's most heavily populated area, offers a splendid view of Sanibel Island and the Sanibel Causeway.

Bokeelia extends to the far northern tip of Pine Island, ending at tiny Bokeelia Island, which is accessed by a small bridge. Bokeelia is at the mouth of Charlotte Harbor. On clear days one can see across the water to Cape Haze and Boca Grande Pass where the gulf meets the harbor. Pineland is also on the northern portion of Pine Island, west off Stringfellow Road, about halfway between Pine Island Center and Bokeelia. Pineland features a golf course and country club as well as the Randell Research Center. The Randell Research Center is located near several shell mounds, which are the remains of a Calusa Indian village that was located at the site for more than 1500 years. The center is dedicated to learning and teaching the archaeology, history, and ecology of Southwest Florida and about the culture of the Calusa people.

East of Pine Island Center, along a two-mile (3 km) stretch of Pine Island Road, is Little Pine Island. Little Pine Island is a  development-free wildlife preserve and the former location of a sewer treatment plant. The island community of Matlacha (pronounced "mat-luh-SHAY") is east of Little Pine Island and west of the city of Cape Coral on the mainland. The Matlacha Bridge, a small drawbridge nicknamed "The fishingest bridge in the world", almost always is occupied by fishermen. Matlacha also has a large park and pier, as well as several shops, bars, and restaurants.

Ecology
Pine Island is also home to Matlacha Pass National Wildlife Refuge. Little Pine Island is a state-owned wildlife refuge, currently being restored to its natural state by the elimination of the development features that had been built on the island. Ospreys, herons, egrets, ibises, and roseate spoonbills often are seen on the island, as well as owls, hawks, bald eagles, and many songbirds.

The local form of the marsh rice rat has been recognized in some classifications as a separate subspecies, Oryzomys palustris planirostris.

Hurricanes
Pine Island was significantly impacted in 2004 when Hurricane Charley passed through the area. In 2022, Hurricane Ian devastated the island, including causing major damage to the bridge leading to the mainland.

References

External links
Pine Island Chamber of Commerce
Pineland - The Calusa Heritage Trail

 
Gulf Coast barrier islands of Florida
Islands of Lee County, Florida